The Garrwa people, also spelt Karawa and Garawa, are an Aboriginal Australian people living in the Northern Territory, whose traditional lands extended from east of the McArthur River at Borroloola to Doomadgee and the Nicholson River in Queensland.

Language

Together with the Waanyi language, Garrwa belongs to the Garrwan language family, and had two dialects: the heavy eastern Guninderri and the light western variety of Garrwa. Its status within the larger Pama-Nyungan family is disputed: though it shares some features, it also displays many innovative forms that are rare in other Australian languages, suggesting that it fits a distinctive typology.

Country
Their territory was rocky, crossing the plateau from the Robinson River homestead and the
Foelsche River, running as far south as the headwaters of the former and Seigalls Creek Homestead. Their eastern flank went beyond Calvert Hills as far as
east to Wollogorang close to the Queensland border and to the Westmoreland outstation.

Maps have the Yanyuwa people to the north of the Garrwa, the Waanyi and Gudanji to their south, and the Yukulta / Ganggalidda to their east. Today the Garrwa people consider themselves related to the area along the Gulf of Carpentaria coastline of Queensland, around the Wearyan and Robinson Rivers. Two other groups, the Binbinga and Wilangarra became extinct soon after the beginning of white colonisation.
The Garrwa habitat extended from the northern tropical, with its mangroves to southern semi-arid inland, with its sandstone gorges. According to the seasons, they would venture into the Bukalara (Barkly Tableland). They see themselves as a freshwater people, distinct from the saltwater peoples to the north and east, harvesting food available in the riverine ecosystem – crayfish, turtles, tubers and waterlies – along with land game such as kangaroo, echidnas and possums.

Drawing on a paraphrase by the historian Tony Roberts, the leading modern authority on the Garrwa Ilana Mushin identifies as part of Garrwa lands the area described in the journal kept by Ludwig Leichhardt as he travelled an old aboriginal trade route through the southern coastal area, as that is. The area concerned, now called the Port McArthur Tidal Wetlands System, lay around the Robinson and Wearyan rivers, and Leichhardt
described emu traps around waterholes, fish traps and fishing weirs across rivers, well-used footpaths, major living areas with substantial dwellings, wells of clear water and a sophisticated method of detoxifying the otherwise extremely poisonous cycad nuts. There were moderately high concentrations of people leading an industrious lifestyle. All of this was markedly different to the stereotyped images of 'savages' leading a 'nomadic' and 'primitive' existence.'

Social organization
The Garrwa were divided into clans, the name of which one at least is known.
 Wulungwara (a clan around Wollongorang)

History of contact
With the onset of white colonization, the Garrwa are known to have moved up to the coast as far as Tully Inlet, and there they began to mix with the Yanyuwa.

In 1916 copper was discovered in the area of Redbank in Garrwa territory and thereafter the Redbank Copper Mine was established. The pollution from the overflow of its washed ores has turned the nearby Hanrahan's Creek toxic and seeped over as far as the Wentworth Aggregation wetland, Wollogorang Station and affected sacred aboriginal sites such as Moonlight Falls.

Trading
Much prized kulunja knife blades of the leilira type were fashioned from quartzite mined at a site 6 miles south of the modern Redbanks Copper Mine, and used as articles of trade by the Garrwa. One particular use for them was as barter to obtain young wives from the Lardil of Mornington Island. An early survey of blood types suggested that the Garrwa had a high B phenotype ratio, a characteristic almost non-existent among Australian Aboriginal people, shared only by the Kaiadilt and Tagalag. The Garrwa were considered to be the main source for the B gene in surrounding continental populations.

Alternative names
 Karawa
 Karrawar
 Garawa
 Kurrawar
 Korrawa
 Grawa
 Leearawa
 Kariwa
 Wulungwara
 Wollongorang (toponym)

Notes

Citations

Sources

Aboriginal peoples of the Northern Territory